David Rennie (born 1971) is a British journalist. He is a columnist for The Economist, where until September 2017 he served as the Lexington columnist (Farewell Lexington column). He is currently Beijing bureau chief and author of the Chaguan column on China. He is the son of Sir John Rennie, former 'C' (i.e., Director) of the Secret Intelligence Service (MI6).

Career

David Rennie started his career at the Evening Standard, where he worked from 1992 until 1996. He then went to work for The Daily Telegraph in London, before joining their foreign staff, being posted to Sydney (1998), Beijing (1998–2002), Washington, D.C. (2002–2005), and Brussels (2005–07). From 2006 until 2007 he was also a contributing editor at The Spectator.

Rennie joined The Economist in 2007, writing the Charlemagne column on EU affairs from Brussels, before moving to London, where he wrote the Bagehot column focusing on British politics from July 2010 to July 2012. In 2010, he received the UACES/Thomson Reuters "Reporting Europe" award. Following the death of Peter David in 2012 he moved to Washington, DC to serve as the magazine's Lexington columnist from 2012 to 2017. From 2013 to 2018 he was Washington bureau chief of The Economist. He moved to Beijing to take up a new posting as bureau chief in May 2018. He launched the Chaguan column in September 2018.

Rennie is a regular guest on 1A (radio program), produced by WAMU in Washington, D.C. and distributed nationally by NPR (National Public Radio).

References

External links
Charlemagne columns from The Economist
Who Comments? - David Rennie

British male journalists
The Economist people
1971 births
Living people
UACES award